Dorset Island or Cape Dorset Island is one of the Canadian Arctic islands located in Hudson Strait, Nunavut, Canada. It lies off the Foxe Peninsula area of southwestern Baffin Island in the Qikiqtaaluk Region. It is serviced by an airport and a harbour.

The island was named after the statesman Edward Sackville, 4th Earl of Dorset.

Geography

It is part of the Kingnait Range (Kingnait, in Inuktitut, means "high mountains"). The cape represents the southern tip of the Foxe Peninsula. On September 24, 1631, Captain Luke Foxe named the landform "Cape Dorset" to honour his benefactor, Edward Sackville, 4th Earl of Dorset.

Mallik Island (Mallikjuaq Island), directly to the north, is joined to Dorset Island by sand and boulders. A natural harbour exists in the peninsula formed by the southeast side of Mallik Island and the northwest side of Dorset Island with prevailing northwesterly winds at  knots, stronger in September and October. The anchorage may have heavy swell conditions and there is frequent fog during the navigation season of early August through mid-October. Ice break-up is around mid-July, and freeze-up occurs in early November.

There are several other islands within , including Ukaliqtuuq and Saqajaa.

History
In 1913, a trading post was established on the island by the Hudson's Bay Company. A Roman Catholic mission was located on Dorset Island during the period of 1938 to 1960.

The first discovery of the remains of Dorset culture was on Dorset Island. An ancient Paleo-Eskimo people, they flourished in this area for about 2,000 years, during the period of 1000 BC through 1100 AD. Present-day Dorset Islanders, Inuit who descend from the later Thule culture, refer to Dorset culture people as Tuniit in their legends.

In 1947, the Nascopie, a Hudson's Bay Company supply ship was wrecked on the island. Some of the ship was salvaged by Inuit for building supplies.

Community
Across from Mallik Island, on the northern side of Dorset Island is located the Inuit hamlet of Kinngait (formerly Cape Dorset). It is the only community on the island and is home to  1,396 people. Because the people of this community are known for their artisanship, including drawing, printmaking, and carving, the community of Kinngait is commonly referred to as the "Inuit art capital".

Gallery

Wildlife
The island and its surrounds are frequented by Baffin Island wolves, polar bears, and Arctic fox, as well as caribou and Arctic hare. Seals appear regularly, as do beluga whales during their migration through by the island in October and April.

Peregrine falcons, snowy owls, ptarmigan and ducks abound. Ornithologists consider the island's cape a major entry way to the nesting area of the blue goose. In 1929, it was the departure point for naturalist Dr. J. Dewey Soper in his quest for locate the blue goose's Foxe Basin nest area.

Mallikjuaq Territorial Park spans both Dorset Island and Mallik Island. Notable for its Thule culture, Dorset culture, and Inuit archaeological sites that date back as far as 3,000 years ago, it is reachable by foot from Kinngait at low tide, or by boat.

Climate
The area has a tundra climate (ET) with short but cool summers and long cold winters.

References

Islands of Baffin Island
Islands of Hudson Strait
Inhabited islands of Qikiqtaaluk Region